Edna Gross (12 December 1910 – 18 September 1999) was a British gymnast. She competed in the women's artistic team all-around event at the 1936 Summer Olympics. She was also a coach for the gymnast team at the 1960 Summer Olympics. She later became the President of the Croydon School of Gymnastics, with their top award named in her honour.

References

External links
 

1910 births
1999 deaths
British female artistic gymnasts
Olympic gymnasts of Great Britain
Gymnasts at the 1936 Summer Olympics
Place of birth missing